Hogshaw Nunnery was a nunnery in Hogshaw, Buckinghamshire, England. In the 15th century it became the Hogshaw Commandery, associated with the Knights Templar.

References

Monasteries in Buckinghamshire
Nunneries in England
15th-century disestablishments in England
15th-century establishments in England
Religious organizations established in the 15th century
Christian monasteries established in the 15th century
Knights Templar